

Events

Pre-1600
 768 – Carloman I and Charlemagne are crowned kings of the Franks.
1238 – James I of Aragon founds the Kingdom of Valencia.
1410 – The first known mention of the Prague astronomical clock.
1446 – The Hangul alphabet is published in Korea.
1594 – Troops of the Portuguese Empire are defeated on Sri Lanka, bringing an end to the Campaign of Danture.

1601–1900
1604 – Kepler's Supernova is the most recent supernova to be observed within the Milky Way.
1635 – Roger Williams is banished from the Massachusetts Bay Colony after religious and policy disagreements.
1701 – The Collegiate School of Connecticut (later renamed Yale University) is chartered in Old Saybrook.
1708 – Peter the Great defeats the Swedes at the Battle of Lesnaya.
1740 – Dutch colonists and Javanese natives begin a massacre of the ethnic Chinese population in Batavia, eventually killing at least 10,000.
1760 – Seven Years' War: Russian and Austrian troops briefly occupy Berlin.
1790 – A severe earthquake in northern Algeria causes severe damage and a tsunami in the Mediterranean Sea and kills three thousand.
1799 –  sinks with the loss of 240 men and a cargo worth £1,200,000.
1804 – Hobart, capital of Tasmania, is founded.
1806 – Prussia begins the War of the Fourth Coalition against France.
1820 – Guayaquil declares independence from Spain.
1825 – Restauration arrives in New York Harbor from Norway, the first organized immigration from Norway to the United States.
1831 – Ioannis Kapodistrias, the first head of state of the Kingdom of Greece, is assassinated.
1834 – Opening of the Dublin and Kingstown Railway, the first public railway on the island of Ireland.
1847 – Slavery is abolished in the Swedish colony of Saint Barthélemy.
1854 – Crimean War: The siege of Sevastopol begins.
1861 – American Civil War: Union troops repel a Confederate attempt to capture Fort Pickens at the Battle of Santa Rosa Island.
1864 – American Civil War: Union cavalrymen defeat Confederate forces at Toms Brook, Virginia.
1873 – A meeting at the U.S. Naval Academy establishes the U.S. Naval Institute.
1874 – The Universal Postal Union is created by the Treaty of Bern.
1900 – The Cook Islands become a territory of the United Kingdom.

1901–present
1911 – An accidental bomb explosion triggers the Wuchang Uprising against the Qing dynasty, beginning the Xinhai Revolution. 
1913 – The steamship  catches fire in the mid-Atlantic.
1914 – World War I: The Siege of Antwerp comes to an end.
1918 – The Finnish Parliament offers to Prince Frederick Charles of Hesse the throne of a short-lived Kingdom of Finland.          
1919 – The Cincinnati Reds win the World Series, resulting in the Black Sox Scandal.
1934 – An Ustashe assassin kills King Alexander I of Yugoslavia and Louis Barthou, Foreign Minister of France, in Marseille. 
1936 – Boulder Dam (later Hoover Dam) begins to generate electricity and transmit it to Los Angeles.
1937 – Murder of 9 Catholic priests in Zhengding, China, who protected the local population from the advancing Japanese army.
1941 – A coup in Panama declares Ricardo Adolfo de la Guardia Arango the new president.
1942 – Australia's Statute of Westminster Adoption Act 1942 receives royal assent.
1950 – The Goyang Geumjeong Cave massacre in Korea begins.
1962 – Uganda becomes an independent Commonwealth realm.
1963 – In Italy, a large landslide causes a giant wave to overtop the Vajont Dam, killing over 2,000.
1966 – Vietnam War: the Republic of Korea Army commits the Binh Tai Massacre.
1967 – A day after his capture, Ernesto "Che" Guevara is executed for attempting to incite a revolution in Bolivia.
1969 – In Chicago, the National Guard is called in as demonstrations continue over the trial of the "Chicago Eight".
1970 – The Khmer Republic is proclaimed in Cambodia.
1980 – Pope John Paul II greets the Dalai Lama during a private audience in Vatican City.
1981 – President François Mitterrand abolishes capital punishment in France.
1983 – South Korean President Chun Doo-hwan survives an assassination attempt in Rangoon, Burma (present-day Yangon, Myanmar), but the blast kills 21 and injures 17 others.
1984 – The popular children's television show Thomas The Tank Engine & Friends, based on The Railway Series by the Reverend Wilbert Awdry, premieres on ITV.
1986 – The Phantom of the Opera, eventually the second longest running musical in London, opens at Her Majesty's Theatre.
  1986   – Fox Broadcasting Company (FBC) launches as the "fourth" US television network.
1992 – The Peekskill meteorite, a  meteorite crashed into a parked car in Peekskill, New York
1995 – An Amtrak Sunset Limited train is derailed by saboteurs near Palo Verde, Arizona.
2006 – North Korea conducts its first nuclear test.
2007 – The Dow Jones Industrial Average reaches its all-time high of 14,164 points before rapidly declining due to the 2007-2008 financial crises. 
2009 – First lunar impact of NASA's Lunar Precursor Robotic Program.
2012 – Pakistani Taliban attempt to assassinate outspoken schoolgirl Malala Yousafzai.
2016 – The Arakan Rohingya Salvation Army launches its first attack on Myanmar security forces along the Bangladesh–Myanmar border.
2019 – Turkey begins its military offensive in north-eastern Syria.

Births

Pre-1600
1201 – Robert de Sorbon, French minister and theologian, founded the Collège de Sorbonne (d. 1274)
1221 – Salimbene di Adam, Italian historian and scholar (d. 1290)
1261 – Denis of Portugal (d. 1325)
1328 – Peter I of Cyprus (d. 1369)
1581 – Claude Gaspard Bachet de Méziriac, French mathematician, poet, and scholar (d. 1638)
1586 – Leopold V, Archduke of Austria (d. 1632)
1593 – Nicolaes Tulp, Dutch anatomist and politician (d. 1674)

1601–1900
1609 – Thomas Weston, 4th Earl of Portland, English noble (d. 1688)
1623 – Ferdinand Verbiest, Flemish Jesuit missionary in China (d. 1688)
1704 – Johann Andreas Segner, German mathematician, physicist, and physician (d. 1777)
1757 – Charles X of France (d. 1836)
1796 – Joseph Bonomi the Younger, British Egyptologist and sculptor (d. 1878)
1826 – Agathon Meurman, Finnish politician and journalist (d. 1909)
1835 – Camille Saint-Saëns, French composer and conductor (d. 1921)
1837 – Francis Wayland Parker, American theorist and academic (d. 1902)
1840 – Simeon Solomon, English painter (d. 1905)
1845 – Carl Gustav Thulin, Swedish shipowner (d. 1918)
1850 – Hermann von Ihering, German-Brazilian zoologist (d. 1930)
1852 – Hermann Emil Fischer, German chemist and academic, Nobel Prize laureate (d. 1919)
1858 – Mihajlo Pupin, Serbian-American physicist and chemist (d. 1935)
1859 – Alfred Dreyfus, French colonel (d. 1935)
1863 – Edward Bok, Dutch-American journalist and author (d. 1930)
1864 – Reginald Dyer, British brigadier general (d. 1927)
1871 – Georges Gauthier, Canadian archbishop (d. 1940)
1873 – Carl Flesch, Hungarian violinist and educator (d. 1944)
  1873   – Karl Schwarzschild, German physicist and astronomer (d. 1916)
  1873   – Charles Rudolph Walgreen, American pharmacist and businessman, founded Walgreens (d. 1939)
1874 – Nicholas Roerich, Russian archaeologist and painter (d. 1947)
1877 – Gopabandhu Das, Indian journalist, poet, and activist (d. 1928)
1879 – Max von Laue, German physicist and academic, Nobel Prize laureate (d. 1960)
1880 – Charlie Faust, American baseball player (d. 1915)
1883 – Maria Filotti, Greek-Romanian actress (d. 1956)
1886 – Rube Marquard, American baseball player and manager (d. 1980)
1888 – Nikolai Bukharin, Russian journalist and politician (d. 1938)
  1888   – Irving Cummings, American actor, director, producer, and screenwriter (d. 1959)
1890 – Aimee Semple McPherson, Canadian-American evangelist, founded the International Church of the Foursquare Gospel (d. 1944)
1892 – Ivo Andrić, Yugoslav novelist, poet, and short story writer, Nobel Prize laureate (d. 1975)
1893 – Mário de Andrade, Brazilian author, poet, and photographer (d. 1945)
1897 – M. Bhaktavatsalam, Indian lawyer and politician, 6th Chief Minister of Madras State (d. 1987)
1898 – Tawfiq al-Hakim, Egyptian author and playwright (d. 1987)
  1898   – Joe Sewell, American baseball player (d. 1990)
1899 – Bruce Catton, American historian and author (d. 1978)
1900 – Joseph Friedman, American inventor (d. 1982)
  1900   – Alastair Sim, Scottish-English actor and academic (d. 1976)
  1900   – Joseph Zubin, Lithuanian-American psychologist and academic (d. 1990)

1901–present
1901 – Alice Lee Jemison, Seneca political activist and journalist (d. 1964)
1902 – Freddie Young, English cinematographer (d. 1998)
1903 – Walter O'Malley, American lawyer and businessman (d. 1979)
1906 – J. R. Eyerman, American photographer and journalist (d. 1985)
  1906   – Léopold Sédar Senghor, Senegalese poet and politician, 1st President of Senegal (d. 2001)
1907 – Quintin Hogg, Baron Hailsham of St Marylebone, English academic and politician, Lord High Chancellor of Great Britain (d. 2001)
  1907   – Jacques Tati, French actor, director, and screenwriter (d. 1982)
  1907   – Horst Wessel, German SA officer (d. 1930)
1908 – Harry Hooton, Australian poet and critic (d. 1961)
  1908   – Werner von Haeften, German lieutenant (d. 1944)
  1908   – Lee Wiley, American singer (d. 1975)
1909 – Donald Coggan, English archbishop (d. 2000)
1911 – Joe Rosenthal, American photographer (d. 2006)
1914 – Edward Andrews, American actor (d. 1985)
1915 – Clifford M. Hardin, American academic and politician, 17th United States Secretary of Agriculture (d. 2010)
  1915   – Belva Plain, American author (d. 2010) 
1918 – E. Howard Hunt, American CIA officer and author (d. 2007)
  1918   – Charles Read, Australian air marshal (d. 2014)
  1918   – Bebo Valdés, Cuban-Swedish pianist, composer, and bandleader (d. 2013)
1920 – Jens Bjørneboe, Norwegian author and educator (d. 1976)
  1920   – Yusef Lateef, American saxophonist, composer, and educator (d. 2013)
  1920   – Jason Wingreen, American actor and screenwriter (d. 2015)
1921 – Michel Boisrond, French director and screenwriter (d. 2002)
  1921   – Tadeusz Różewicz, Polish poet and playwright (d. 2014)
1922 – Léon Dion, Canadian political scientist and academic (d. 1997)
  1922   – Philip "Fyvush" Finkel, American actor (d. 2016)
  1922   – Olga Guillot, Cuban-American singer (d. 2010)
1923 – Donald Sinden, English actor (d. 2014)
1924 – Immanuvel Devendrar, Indian soldier (d. 1957)
  1924   – Arnie Risen, American basketball player (d. 2012)
1926 – Danièle Delorme, French actress and producer (d. 2015)
1927 – John Margetson, English scholar and diplomat, British Ambassador to the Netherlands (d. 2020)
1928 – Einojuhani Rautavaara, Finnish composer and educator (d. 2016)
1930 – Hank Lauricella, American football player, lieutenant, and politician (d. 2014)
1931 – Tony Booth, English actor (d. 2017)
  1931   – Homer Smith, American football player and coach (d. 2011)
1933 – Peter Mansfield, English physicist and academic, Nobel Prize laureate (d. 2017)
  1933   – Melvin Sokolsky, American fashion photographer (d. 2022)
  1933   – Bill Tidy, English soldier and cartoonist
1934 – Jill Ker Conway, Australian historian and author (d. 2018)
  1934   – Abdullah Ibrahim, South African pianist and composer
1935 – Prince Edward, Duke of Kent
  1935   – Don McCullin, English photographer and journalist
1936 – Brian Blessed, English actor 
  1936   – Mick Young, Australian politician (d. 1996)
1938 – Heinz Fischer, Austrian academic and politician, 11th President of Austria
  1938   – John Sutherland, English journalist, author, and academic
1939 – Nicholas Grimshaw, English architect and academic
  1939   – John Pilger, Australian-English journalist, director, and producer
  1939   – Stephen Sedley, English lawyer and judge
  1939   – O. V. Wright, American singer-songwriter and producer (d. 1980)
1940 – Gordon J. Humphrey, American soldier, pilot, and politician
  1940   – John Lennon, English singer-songwriter, guitarist, and producer (d. 1980)
  1940   – Joe Pepitone, American baseball player and coach (d. 2023)
1941 – Brian Lamb, American broadcaster, founded C-SPAN
  1941   – Trent Lott, American lawyer and politician
  1941   – Omali Yeshitela, political activist and founder of the Uhuru Movement
1942 – Michael Palmer, American physician and author (d. 2013)
1943 – Douglas Kirby, American psychologist and author (d. 2012)
  1943   – Jimmy Montgomery, English footballer and coach
  1943   – Mike Peters, American cartoonist
1944 – Rita Donaghy, Baroness Donaghy, English academic and politician
  1944   – John Entwistle, English singer-songwriter, bass player, and producer (d. 2002)
  1944   – Nona Hendryx, American singer-songwriter, producer, and actress
1945 – Taiguara, Uruguayan-Brazilian singer-songwriter (d. 1996)
  1945   – Amjad Ali Khan, Indian classical Sarod player
1947 – John Doubleday, English sculptor and painter
  1947   – France Gall, French singer (d. 2018)
  1947   – William E. McAnulty Jr., American lawyer and judge (d. 2007)
  1947   – Tony Zappone, American photographer and journalist
1948 – Jackson Browne, American singer-songwriter and guitarist 
  1948   – John Gray, English cricketer and rugby player
1949 – Rod Temperton, English keyboard player, songwriter, and producer (d. 2016)
  1949   – Mark Hopkinson, American mass murderer (d. 1992)
1950 – Brian Downing, American baseball player
  1950   – Yoshiyuki Konishi, Japanese fashion designer
  1950   – Reichi Nakaido, Japanese singer and guitarist 
  1950   – Jody Williams, American academic and activist, Nobel Prize laureate
1952 – Simon Drew, English illustrator
  1952   – Sharon Osbourne, English television host and manager
  1952   – John Rose, English businessman
  1952   – Dennis Stratton, English singer-songwriter and guitarist 
1953 – Sally Burgess, South African-English soprano and educator
  1953   – Hank Pfister, American tennis player
  1953   – Tony Shalhoub, American actor and producer
1954 – Scott Bakula, American actor
  1954   – James Fearnley, English musician
  1954   – John O'Hurley, American actor and game show host
  1954   – Rubén Magnano, Argentine-Italian professional basketball coach 
1955 – Linwood Boomer, Canadian actor, producer, and screenwriter
  1955   – Steve Ovett, English runner and sportscaster
  1955   – Peter Saville, English graphic designer and art director
1957 – Don Garber, American businessman
  1957   – Ini Kamoze, Jamaican singer-songwriter
1958 – Al Jourgensen, Cuban-American singer-songwriter and producer 
  1958   – Alan Nunnelee, American lawyer and politician (d. 2015)
  1958   – Mike Singletary, American football player and coach
1959 – Boris Nemtsov, Russian academic and politician, First Deputy Prime Minister of Russia (d. 2015)
1960 – Kenny Garrett, American saxophonist and composer 
1961 – Julian Bailey, English race car driver and sportscaster
  1961   – Kurt Neumann, American singer-songwriter and guitarist
  1961   – Ellen Wheeler, American actress, director, and producer
1962 – Jorge Burruchaga, Argentinian footballer and manager
  1962   – Paul Radisich, New Zealand race car driver
  1962   – Hugh Robertson, English soldier and politician, Minister for Sport and the Olympics
  1962   – Ōnokuni Yasushi, Japanese sumo wrestler, the 62nd Yokozuna
1963 – Andy Platt, English rugby league player
1964 – Guillermo del Toro, Mexican-American director, producer, and screenwriter
  1964   – Martín Jaite, Argentine tennis player
1965 – Jimbo Fisher, American football player and coach
1966 – David Cameron, English politician, Prime Minister of the United Kingdom
  1966   – Christopher Östlund, Swedish publisher, founded Plaza Magazine
1967 – Carling Bassett-Seguso, Canadian tennis player
  1967   – Eddie Guerrero, American wrestler (d. 2005)
  1967   – Gheorghe Popescu, Romanian footballer 
1968 – Anbumani Ramadoss, Indian politician 
1969 – Guto Bebb, Welsh businessman and politician
  1969   – Darren Britt, Australian rugby league player
  1969   – Simon Fairweather, Australian archer
  1969   – PJ Harvey, English musician, singer-songwriter, writer, poet, and composer  
  1969   – Christine Hough, Canadian figure skater and coach
  1969   – Giles Martin, English songwriter and producer
  1969   – Steve McQueen, English director, producer, and screenwriter
1970 – Kenny Anderson, American basketball player and coach
  1970   – Steve Jablonsky, American composer
  1970   – Annika Sörenstam, Swedish golfer and architect
1971 – Wayne Bartrim, Australian rugby league player and coach
1973 – Fabio Lione, Italian singer-songwriter and keyboard player 
 1973    – Steve Burns, American actor, television host and musician
1974 – Shmuel Herzfeld, American rabbi
1975 – Haylie Ecker, Australian violinist 
  1975   – Sean Lennon, American singer-songwriter, guitarist, producer, and actor
  1975   – Mark Viduka, Australian footballer
1976 – William Alexander, American author and educator
  1976   – Lee Peacock, Scottish footballer and coach
  1976   – Özlem Türköne, Turkish journalist and politician
  1976   – Nick Swardson, American actor and comedian
1977 – Emanuele Belardi, Italian footballer
  1977   – Brian Roberts, American baseball player
1978 – Nicky Byrne, Irish singer-songwriter 
  1978   – Juan Dixon, American basketball player and coach
1979 – Vernon Fox, American football player and coach
  1979   – Alex Greenwald, American singer-songwriter, producer, and actor 
  1979   – Todd Kelly, Australian race car driver
  1979   – Chris O'Dowd, Irish actor, producer, and screenwriter
  1979   – Brandon Routh, American model and actor
  1979   – Gonzalo Sorondo, Uruguayan footballer
1980 – Lucy Akello, Ugandan social worker and politician
  1980   – Filip Bobek, Polish actor
  1980   – Sarah Lovell, Australian politician
  1980   – Thami Tsolekile, South African cricketer
  1980   – Henrik Zetterberg, Swedish ice hockey player
1983 – Stephen Gionta, American ice hockey player
  1983   – Farhaan Behardien, South African cricketer
  1983   – Jang Mi-ran, South Korean weightlifter
  1983   – Andreas Zuber, Austrian race car driver
1985 – David Plummer, American swimmer 
1986 – Derek Holland, American baseball player
  1986   – Laure Manaudou, French swimmer
  1986   – Stephane Zubar, French footballer
1988 – David Tyrrell, Australian rugby league player
1989 – Russell Packer, New Zealand rugby league player
1990 – Kevin Kampl, German-Slovene footballer
1992 – Sam Mewis, American soccer player
1993 – Ani Amiraghyan, Armenian tennis player
  1993   – Lauren Davis, American tennis player
  1993   – Jayden Hodges, Australian rugby league player
  1993   – Wesley So, Filipino-American chess grandmaster
1996 – Bella Hadid, American model
2001 – Kyla Leibel, Canadian swimmer

Deaths

Pre-1600
 680 – Ghislain, Frankish anchorite and saint 
 892 – Al-Tirmidhi, Persian scholar and hadith compiler (b. 824)
1047 – Pope Clement II
1212 – Philip I of Namur, Marquis of Namur (b. 1175)
1253 – Robert Grosseteste, English bishop and philosopher (b. 1175)
1273 – Elisabeth of Bavaria, Queen of Germany (b. 1227)
1296 – Louis III, Duke of Bavaria (b. 1269)
1390 – John I of Castile (b. 1358)
1555 – Justus Jonas, German academic and reformer (b. 1493)
1562 – Gabriele Falloppio, Italian anatomist and physician (b. 1523)
1569 – Vladimir of Staritsa (b. 1533)
1581 – Louis Bertrand, Spanish missionary and saint (b. 1526)

1601–1900
1613 – Henry Constable, English poet (b. 1562)
1619 – Joseph Pardo, Italian rabbi and merchant (b. 1561)
1691 – William Sacheverell, English politician (b. 1638)
1729 – Richard Blackmore, English physician and poet (b. 1654)
1793 – Jean Joseph Marie Amiot, French missionary and linguist (b. 1718)
1797 – Vilna Gaon, Lithuanian rabbi and scholar (b. 1720)
1806 – Benjamin Banneker, American astronomer and surveyor (b. 1731)
1808 – John Claiborne, American lawyer and politician (b. 1777)
1831 – Ioannis Kapodistrias, Russian-Greek lawyer and politician, Governor of Greece (b. 1776)
1873 – George Ormerod, English historian and author (b. 1785)
1897 – Jan Heemskerk, Dutch lawyer and politician, Prime Minister of the Netherlands (b. 1818)
1900 – Heinrich von Herzogenberg, Austrian composer and conductor (b. 1843)

1901–present
1911 – Jack Daniel, American businessman, founded Jack Daniel's (b. 1849) 
1924 – Valery Bryusov, Russian author, poet, and critic (b. 1873)
1934 – Alexander I of Yugoslavia, King of Yugoslavia also known as Alexander the Unifier  (b. 1888)
1934 – Louis Barthou, French union leader and politician, 78th Prime Minister of France (b. 1862)
1937 – Ernest Louis, Grand Duke of Hesse (b. 1868)
1940 – Wilfred Grenfell, English-American physician and missionary (b. 1865)
1941 – Helen Morgan, American singer and actress (b. 1900)
1943 – Pieter Zeeman, Dutch physicist and academic, Nobel Prize laureate (b. 1865)
1944 – Stefanina Moro, Italian partisan (b. 1927)
1945 – Gottlieb Hering, German captain (b. 1887)
1946 – Frank Castleman, American football player, baseball player, and coach (b. 1877)
1947 – Yukio Sakurauchi, Japanese businessman and politician, 27th Japanese Minister of Finance (b. 1888)
1950 – George Hainsworth, Canadian ice hockey player and politician (b. 1895)
1953 – James Finlayson, Scottish-American actor (b. 1887)
1955 – Theodor Innitzer, Austrian cardinal (b. 1875)
1956 – Marie Doro, American actress (b. 1882)
1958 – Pope Pius XII (b. 1876)
1959 – Shirō Ishii, Japanese general and biologist (b. 1892)
1962 – Milan Vidmar, Slovenian chess player and engineer (b. 1885)
1967 – Che Guevara, Argentinian-Cuban physician, politician and guerrilla leader (b. 1928)
  1967   – Cyril Norman Hinshelwood, English chemist and academic, Nobel Prize laureate (b. 1897)
  1967   – André Maurois, French soldier and author (b. 1885)
  1967   – Joseph Pilates, German-American fitness trainer, developed Pilates (b. 1883)
1969 – Don Hoak, American baseball player (b. 1928)
1972 – Miriam Hopkins, American actress (b. 1902)
1974 – Oskar Schindler, Czech-German businessman (b. 1908)
1975 – Noon Meem Rashid, Pakistani poet (b. 1910)
1976 – Walter Warlimont, German general (b. 1894)
1978 – Jacques Brel, Belgian singer-songwriter and actor (b. 1929)
1982 – Herbert Meinhard Mühlpfordt, German historian and physician (b. 1893)
1985 – Emílio Garrastazu Médici, Brazilian general and politician, 28th President of Brazil (b. 1905)
1987 – Clare Boothe Luce, American author, playwright, and diplomat, United States Ambassador to Italy (b. 1903)
  1987   – William P. Murphy, American physician and academic, Nobel Prize laureate (b. 1892)
1988 – Felix Wankel, German engineer, invented the Wankel engine (b. 1902)
1989 – Yusuf Atılgan, Turkish author and playwright (b. 1921)
  1989   – Penny Lernoux, American journalist and author (b. 1940)
1995 – Alec Douglas-Home, British cricketer and politician, Prime Minister of the United Kingdom (b. 1903)
1996 – Walter Kerr, American author, composer, and critic (b. 1913)
1999 – Milt Jackson, American vibraphone player and composer (b. 1923)
  1999   – Akhtar Hameed Khan, Pakistani economist and scholar (b. 1914)
2000 – David Dukes, American actor (b. 1945)
  2000   – Patrick Anthony Porteous, Indian-Scottish colonel, Victoria Cross recipient (b. 1918)
2001 – Herbert Ross, American director, producer, and choreographer (b. 1927)
2002 – Sopubek Begaliev, Kyrgyzstani economist and politician (b. 1931)
  2002   – Charles Guggenheim, American director, producer, and screenwriter (b. 1924)
2003 – Carolyn Gold Heilbrun, American author and academic (b. 1926)
  2003   – Carl Fontana, American jazz trombonist (b. 1928)
2004 – Jacques Derrida, Algerian-French philosopher and academic (b. 1930)
2005 – Louis Nye, American actor (b. 1913)
2006 – Danièle Huillet, French filmmaker (b. 1933)
  2006   – Paul Hunter, English snooker player (b. 1978)
  2006   – Kanshi Ram, Indian lawyer and politician (b. 1934)
2007 – Enrico Banducci, American businessman, founded hungry i (b. 1922)
  2007   – Carol Bruce, American actress and singer (b. 1919)
2009 – Stuart M. Kaminsky, American author and educator (b. 1934)
  2009   – John Daido Loori, American Zen Buddhist monastic and teacher (b. 1931)
  2009   – Horst Szymaniak, German footballer (b. 1934)
2010 – Maurice Allais, French economist and physicist, Nobel Prize laureate (b. 1911)
2011 – Pavel Karelin, Russian ski jumper (b. 1989)
2012 – Sammi Kane Kraft, American actress (b. 1992)
  2012   – Kenny Rollins, American basketball player (b. 1923)
  2012   – Harris Savides, American cinematographer (b. 1957)
2013 – Solomon Lar, Nigerian educator and politician, 4th Governor of Plateau State (b. 1933)
  2013   – Srihari, Indian actor (b. 1964)
  2013   – Wilfried Martens, Belgian lawyer and politician, 60th Prime Minister of Belgium (b. 1936)
  2013   – Edmund Niziurski, Polish sociologist, lawyer, and author (b. 1925) 
2014 – Boris Buzančić, Croatian actor and politician, 47th Mayor of Zagreb (b. 1929)
  2014   – Jan Hooks, American actress and comedienne (b. 1957)
  2014   – Carolyn Kizer, American poet and academic (b. 1925)
  2014   – Peter A. Peyser, American soldier and politician (b. 1921)
  2014   – Rita Shane, American soprano and educator (b. 1936)
2015 – Ray Duncan, American businessman (b. 1930)
  2015   – Richard F. Heck, American chemist and academic, Nobel Prize laureate (b. 1931)
  2015   – Geoffrey Howe, Welsh lawyer and politician, Deputy Prime Minister of the United Kingdom (b. 1926)
  2015   – Ravindra Jain, Indian composer and director (b. 1944)
2016 – Andrzej Wajda, Polish film and theatre director (b. 1926)
2017 – Jean Rochefort, French actor (b. 1930)

Holidays and observances
Christian feast day:
Abraham
Denis
Dionysius the Areopagite
Ghislain
Innocencio of Mary Immaculate and Martyrs of Asturias
John Henry Newman
John Leonardi
Luis Beltran
Robert Grosseteste (Church of England)
Wilfred Grenfell (Episcopal Church (USA))
October 9 (Eastern Orthodox liturgics)
Fire Prevention Day (Canada, United States) 
Hangul Day (South Korea)
Independence Day, celebrates the independence of Uganda from United Kingdom in 1962. (Uganda)
Independence of Guayaquil from Spain in 1820 (Ecuador)
Leif Erikson Day (United States, Iceland and Norway)
National Day of Commemorating the Holocaust (Romania)
National Nanotechnology Day (United States)
Takayama Autumn Festival (Takayama, Japan)
World Post Day
Indian Foreign Service Day

References

External links

 
 
 

Days of the year
October